Corringham is a town and former civil parish in Essex, England, located directly next to the town of Stanford-le-Hope, about  east of London and  south of Basildon. Corringham lies on a hill overlooking the Thames between Canvey Island and Tilbury Fort.

Corringham is also a Church of England parish stretching from Horseshoe Bay in the Thames Estuary to Dry Street, south of Langdon Hills. St Mary the Virgin Church is the first of its two parish churches, and originated in the Saxon period from the time of St Cedd in the 7th century. 

Corringham was formerly served by the Corringham Light Railway which connected the Kynoch munitions factory with the London, Tilbury and Southend Railway. The small historic heart is one of the seven conservation areas in the borough, which is for local government matters a unitary authority. Today, the town is located close to the A13.

History

Early history of Corringham 
In 1970 excavations took place at the site of the old railway terminus, south of Fobbing Road, revealing the remains of Mesolithic (Middle Stone Age) tools.

Saxon period 
It is likely that where the church stands today, Curra the Tribal Chief of the Saxons came with mercenaries following and replacing Roman soldiers of the 1st and 2nd centuries, who then over the following centuries settled as permanent residents of Corringham.

By the 7th century Corringham would have had a Saxon community, and it is thought that St Cedd, who established Tilbury Monastery in AD 653, established a church here. The last Saxon Lord of Corringham was known as Sigar in 1066, and is mentioned in the Domesday Book of 1086 as holding 1 manor, 4 hides and 10 acres.

Origin of the name
The place-name 'Corringham' is first attested in the Domesday Book of 1086, where it appears as Currincham. It appears as Curingeham in the Feet of Fines for 1204. The name means 'the village of Curra's people'.

Parish church, St Mary the Virgin
St Mary the Virgin Church is of Saxon origin, exterior herringbone stonework in both the nave and the chancel. can be seen. There are other Saxon features inside the church. The tower is also likely to be Saxon.

From the 7th century a wooden structure was erected here where the nave is situated today, this would have been similar in construction to that of Greensted Church near Ongar in Essex, around the 9th century Viking raids on Corringham meant that the church was reinforced by building 3' thick walls around the structure,

Normans, Bishop Odo, and the Baud family 
With the Norman invasion of England in 1066, Corringham came under Norman rule, and was owned and administered by Bishop Odo who was bishop of London. The church underwent a building programme around the year 1100, with the west tower being built around this time. Inside St Mary the Virgin Church, at the arched entrance to the west tower, a Norman carving of a Norman complete with moustache can be seen; it is possible this depicts Bishop Odo.

The Baud Family originally from Germany came over with William the Conqueror in 1066, and became landowners in Corringham, mentioned in 1210, soon after gaining hunting rights.

Mariners and smugglers 
Corringham, being situated in close proximity to the marshes and the Thames, has always had a connection to the movement of goods and shipping. One ancient pathway which still exists passes from the coast, through the cemetery and to the side of the Bull Inn, and then continues on to Hadleigh Castle and South Benfleet.

Governance
In terms of electoral wards (areas of boroughs drawn to contain equal-sized electorates), the town is part of Stanford East and Corringham Town. On 1 April 1936 the parish was abolished to form Thurrock; part also went to Bowers Gifford.

Demography
In 1931 the parish had a population of 1,897.

Schools

Ortu Corringham Primary School, Herd Lane
Giffards Primary School, Queen Elizabeth Drive
Graham James Primary School, The Sorrells
Ortu Gable Hall School, Southend Road. A specialist performing arts and applied learning college.

Sport and leisure

Corringham has a non-League football club, East Thurrock United F.C. who play at Rookery Hill and currently play in the Isthmian League.

Notable people
Mark-Anthony Turnage – composer
Michael Stanley – Samoan international rugby player, educated at Gable Hall School
Denise Van Outen – actress, singer and television presenter	
Rylan Clark-Neal – television presenter, reality TV star, singer, LGBT advocate, model

References

Towns in Essex
Populated places on the River Thames
Former civil parishes in Essex
Thurrock